Atto (or Hatto) was the Duke of Spoleto from 653 to 663, the successor of Theodelap.

Nothing is known of his reign except that he was replaced by Thrasimund, Count of Capua.

References

Paul the Deacon. Historia Langobardorum.
Hodgkin, Thomas. Italy and Her Invaders. Volume VI.

663 deaths
Dukes of Spoleto
7th-century Lombard people
7th-century rulers in Europe
Year of birth unknown